Hibberts Gore (also called Hibberts) is a gore in Lincoln County, Maine, United States. The gore's population was one as of the 2020 United States Census.

History
Ignored by the surveyors who mapped Maine, it remained unincorporated as the rest of the state was divided into cities, towns, and plantations.

Geography
According to the United States Census Bureau, Hibberts Gore has a total area of 0.752 sq mi (1.95 km2), of which 0.745 sq mi (1.93 km2) is land and 0.007 sq mi (0.02 km2), or 0.9%, is water. The water is primarily wetlands, part of Sheepscot Pond, which is the headwaters of Sheepscot River.

Demographics

As of the Census of 2020, there was 1 person, 1 household, and 0 families in Hibberts Gore.

See also
Monowi, Nebraska – an incorporated village with a population of one.

References

External links
Maine Genealogy: Hibberts Gore, Lincoln County, Maine

Unorganized territories in Maine
Populated places in Lincoln County, Maine